Marisela Escobedo Ortiz (June 12, 1958 – December 16, 2010) was a Mexican social activist from Juarez, Chihuahua, who was assassinated while protesting the 2008 murder of her daughter.

Background
Marisela Escobedo Ortiz's social activism began in 2008 in Ciudad Juárez following the murder of her 16-year-old daughter Rubí Frayre. Escobedo and her husband claimed that their daughter was murdered by Sergio Rafael Barraza Bocanegra. They managed to locate Barraza in Fresnillo, Zacatecas, where he was arrested and taken to Juarez where he confessed to the crime in court and told of the burial of the remains of Rubí. Barraza was however acquitted by judges for lack of evidence and was released, thereby generating a scandal that became known nationally and internationally.

In response, Escobedo began a series of protests against the resolution against Chihuahua state authorities, asking for Barraza to be arrested and tried again, appealing the decision. A circuit court overturned the acquittal and Barraza was sentenced for murder, while Barraza remained a fugitive from justice. After numerous representations to the governors Jose Reyes Baeza Terrazas and Cesar Duarte Jáquez, they moved their protest to the Plaza Hidalgo in the city of Chihuahua in front of the Government Palace, the home of the governor, where on 16 December 2010 Escobedo was killed by an unknown assassin by a single shot to the head.

Barraza, who was also suspected of ordering Escobedo's murder, was killed during a clash with the Mexican military in 2012.

Timeline of Events 
2008

 August: Escobedo's daughter, Rubí Frayre disappears in Ciudad Juárez.

2009 

 June: Escobedo locates Sergio Rafael Barraza Bocanegra in Zacatecas. He is detained, confesses to the murder of Rubí and provides details on where her body is located.
2010

 April: Citing a lack of evidence, Barraza is acquitted. 
 May: A circuit court overturns the acquittal and sentences Barraza to 50 years in prison for the homicide of Rubí Frayre. 
 July: Escobedo locates Barraza once again in Zacatecas but he escapes before authorities are able to arrest him. Escobedo travels to Mexico City to request an audience with then president of Mexico, Felipe Calderón in order to solicit justice for the murder of her daughter. This request was not granted. Arturo Matus Espino, head of the Oficina de Atención Ciudadana de la Presidencia de la República, met with Escobedo and fellow activist, Bertha Alicia García, and pledged to continue investigating the deaths of Rubí and García's daughter, Brenda Berenice Castillo, as well as accelerate the investigation of cases of femicide in the country
December 8: Escobedo begins a sit-in in front of the Government Palace of Chihuahua, to demand the arrest of Barraza.
December 16: Escobedo is assassinated.

Cultural references

In film
The Netflix documentary Las tres muertes de Marisela Escobedo (2020) directed by Carlos Pérez Osorio is based on her story.

In music 
Marisela Escobedo's name, as well as the name of her daughter, Rubí Frayre, were featured in a version of the song "Canción sin miedo" by Mexican singer/songwriter Vivir Quintana.

In Theatre

La Ruta by Issac Gomez has a character Marisela based on Marisela Escobedo Ortiz

See also
Female homicides in Ciudad Juárez
List of unsolved murders
Mexican Drug War
Susana Chávez

References

External links

1958 births
2010 deaths
2010 murders in Mexico
Female murder victims
Filmed assassinations
Mexican activists
Mexican women activists
Unsolved murders in Mexico
People from Chihuahua City
Femicide in Mexico